Mauritania, officially the Islamic Republic of Mauritania, is a country in western North Africa. Despite being rich in natural resources, Mauritania has one of the lowest GDP rates in Africa. A majority of the population still depends on agriculture and livestock for a livelihood, even though most of the nomads and many subsistence farmers were forced into the cities by recurrent droughts in the 1970s and 1980s. Mauritania has extensive deposits of iron ore, which account for almost 50% of total exports. With the current rises in metal prices, gold and copper mining companies are opening mines in the interior.

Notable firms 
This list includes notable companies with primary headquarters located in the country. The industry and sector follow the Industry Classification Benchmark taxonomy. Organizations which have ceased operations are included and noted as defunct.

See also 
 Economy of Mauritania
 List of banks in Mauritania
 List of airlines of Mauritania

References 

Companies of Mauritania
 
Mauritania